Calamaria lumbricoidea, commonly known as variable reed snake,  is a species of dwarf snake in the family Colubridae . It is found in Thailand, W. Malaysia, Singapore, Indonesia and Philippines.

References

External links
 Flickr photo by Michael Cota

Colubrids
Reptiles described in 1827
Reptiles of Thailand
Reptiles of Malaysia
Reptiles of Indonesia
Calamaria
Reptiles of Borneo